Wang Jingchao (born 13 July 1988 in Tianjin, China) is a former Chinese baseball infielder for the Tianjin Lions. He was a member of the China national baseball team competing in the 2009 World Baseball Classic.

References

External links
 王靖超 

1988 births
2006 World Baseball Classic players
2009 World Baseball Classic players
Baseball players from Tianjin
Chinese baseball players
Chinese expatriate baseball players in Japan
Living people
Yokohama BayStars players